Robert Carlton Evans (born 1969) is an American baseball executive. He served as the general manager of the San Francisco Giants of Major League Baseball from 2015 to 2018.

Early life and education
Evans is from Staten Island, New York. As a young child, his family moved to Framingham, Massachusetts. His father's job with the United States Public Health Service later led the family to move to Jackson, North Carolina. He graduated from Northampton County High School East. He received an Morehead-Cain Scholarship from the University of North Carolina at Chapel Hill (UNC). He attempted to walk on to the North Carolina Tar Heels baseball team. He served as a student manager for the Tar Heels in his freshman year and played baseball at the club level hoping to be added to the Tar Heels' varsity team, which did not happen. Evans began working in Major League Baseball (MLB) as an intern with the Boston Red Sox during the summer after his sophomore year, and graduated from UNC with a degree in business.

Career
After graduating from UNC in 1991, Evans was selected to participate in MLB's executive development program.  He worked in the Commissioner's Office in New York City for three years. Brian Sabean, then-assistant general manager of the San Francisco Giants, hired Evans in 1994 as a minor league administrative assistant.

Evans was promoted to director of minor league operations in 1998, director of player personnel in 2005, and vice president of baseball operations in 2009.  The Giants promoted Sabean to executive vice president of baseball operations and Evans to general manager before the start of the 2015 season. On September 24, 2018, the Giants fired Evans as general manager, reassigning him within the organization.

Personal life
Evans is a Southern Baptist. He and his wife, Gwen, have been married since 1999; they have two sons and a daughter.

References

External links

1969 births
Living people
San Francisco Giants executives
Major League Baseball general managers
University of North Carolina alumni
Baptists from North Carolina
People from Staten Island
People from Framingham, Massachusetts
People from Northampton County, North Carolina
Baptists from New York (state)